Frederick Leypoldt (born Jakob Friedrich Ferdinand Leupold; 17 November 1835 – 31 March 1884) was a German-American bibliographer, the founder of Library Journal, Publishers Weekly, Index Medicus  and other publications.

Early life and education
Frederick Leypoldt was born in 1835 in Stuttgart, Germany, his name at birth being Jakob Friedrich Ferdinand Leupold. Leypoldt had an early liking for the drama and books, and he wrote a play as a youth, which he offered unsuccessfully to German managers. He left school in 1851.

Career
In 1854, he emigrated to the United States, where he simplified his name to Frederick Leypoldt. He entered the service of a bookseller in New York City, which, in 1859, helped him establish himself in business in Philadelphia. In Philadelphia, Leypoldt opened a bookstore and reading room, and in 1863 he began to publish first translations of foreign books, and later foreign textbooks with English notes. In January 1866, with Henry Holt, he established the publishing firm Leypoldt and Holt and moved to New York City.

Leypoldt and Holt continued, but in 1868 Leypoldt decided to devote himself personally to bibliographical work. The monthly Literary Bulletin, his first periodical, which he established in 1868, became the Trade Circular in 1870. In January 1872, the Trade Circular absorbed George W. Childs's Publishers' Circular and was published weekly. In 1873, it became Publishers Weekly.  Leypoldt published an American Catalogue for 1869, and in 1876 he began work on the American catalogue proper, which was completed in 1880. His Publishers' Uniform Trade-List Annual was begun in 1873, the Literary News in 1875, the Library Journal in 1876, and the Index Medicus, a monthly medical bibliography, in 1880. Most of these publications were continued by his friend Richard Rogers Bowker after his untimely death in 1883 (Bowker having purchased Publishers Weekly from him in 1878).

Leypoldt was among the founders of the American Book-Trade Union in 1875, and of the American Library Association in 1876. Under the anagram of "F. Pylodet", he edited a successful series of French textbooks, and he wrote some German verse and translated some works into German.

He died in New York City on 31 March 1884.

References

Other sources

Further reading

External links

 
 L. Pylodet at LC Authorities, with 4 records
 

American bibliographers
American book publishing company founders
German emigrants to the United States
American Library Association people
1835 births
1884 deaths
19th-century American businesspeople